The first practical  was invented by Kyota Sugimoto in 1915. Out of the thousands of kanji characters, Kyota's original typewriter used 2,400 of them. He obtained the patent rights to the typewriter that he invented in 1929. Sugimoto's typewriter met its competition when the Oriental Typewriter was invented by Shimada Minokichi. The Otani Japanese Typewriter Company and Toshiba also released their own typewriters later.

The Japanese typewriter was bulky and laborious to use. Unlike the English-language typewriter, which allows the typist to key in text quickly, one needed to locate and then retrieve the desired character from a large matrix of metal characters. For instance, to type a sentence, the typist would need to find and retrieve around 22 symbols from about three different character matrices, making the sentence longer to type than its romanized version. For this reason, typists were required to undergo specialized training, and word-processing was not part of the duties of the ordinary office worker.

See also
 Chinese typewriter
 Japanese input method

References

External links 

A blog post about Japanese typewriters (includes pictures). Gatunka, 2009.

Typewriters
Japanese inventions
20th-century inventions